Edward Fuller may refer to:
Edward Fuller (U.S. Marine Corps officer) (1893–1918)
Edward Fuller (Mayflower passenger) (1575–1621), passenger on the 1620 voyage of the ship Mayflower
Edward Newman Fuller (1888–1969), English rugby union player
Eddie Fuller (1931–2008), South African cricketer
Edward Laton Fuller, 1800s crime syndicate boss
Eddie Fuller (English footballer) (1900–?)
Ed Fuller (1868–1935), baseball player
Edward M. Fuller & Company, bankrupt New York stock brokerage

See also